Sphaeromorda abessinica is a species of beetle in the genus Sphaeromorda of the family Mordellidae, which is part of the superfamily Tenebrionoidea. It was described in 1968 by Ermisch.

References

Beetles described in 1968
Mordellidae